John Rushout may refer to:
 Sir John Rushout, 4th Baronet  (1685–1775), British politician
 John Rushout, 1st Baron Northwick (1738–1800), British politician, MP for Evesham
 John Rushout, 2nd Baron Northwick (1770–1859), English peer, landowner and collector of art works